The 117th Operations Group is a unit of the Alabama Air National Guard, stationed at Sumpter Smith Air National Guard Base, Alabama.  If activated into federal service, it is gained by Air Mobility Command.

Overview
The group flies the Boeing KC-135R Stratotanker.  Its mission is to train and equip combat ready aircrews and support personnel to perform worldwide air refueling and airlift. Combat ready intelligence technical support is also available for worldwide assignment.  The group supports state and local contingencies when directed by the Governor of Alabama.

Units
The 117th Operations Group consists of the following units:
 106th Air Refueling Squadron
 99th Air Refueling Squadron (attached) The 99th Air Refueling Squadron is an active duty associate unit that supports and flies the group's aircraft.
 117th Operations Support Flight

History

Background
In May 1946, the Army Air Forces redesignated 27 of its combat groups and allotted them to the National Guard.  One of these groups was the 354th Fighter Group, which became the 117th Fighter Group.  However, in 1956, the Air Force decided to return the 354th Group to the active force.  To accomplish this, the 1946 redesignation and allotment was rescinded on 26 September 1956, effective 24 March 1946.  The same order constituted the 117th Fighter Group effective on 24 March 1946, severing any relation between the two units.

Initial activation
The 117th Fighter Group was extended federal recognition by the National Guard Bureau on 1 October 1947 at Birmingham Municipal Airport, Alabama.  As they were organized and received federal recognition, the 153d Fighter Squadron of the Mississippi National Guard, the 157th Fighter Squadron of the South Carolina National Guard and the 160th Fighter Squadron of the Alabama National Guard were assigned.  Training was initially supervised by Air Defense Command, but on 1 July 1948, Continental Air Command assumed responsibility for training Guard and Reserve units.

Korean War activation

The 117th was one of the first Guard units to be ordered to active service for the Korean War, entering active service on 22 October 1950.  Of the group's squadrons, only the 157th and 160th remained assigned to the group when activated.  The group moved to Lawson Air Force Base, Georgia, where it was converted to a reconnaissance unit, becoming the 117th Tactical Reconnaissance Group, adding another federalized squadron, the 112th Tactical Reconnaissance Squadron.  At Lawson, the group trained for overseas deployment.

The group's organization differed from that of regular Air Force units, which had operated under the Wing Base Organization system since 1948.  On 30 November 1950, the Air Force activated the 117th Tactical Reconnaissance Wing and support units and the group was assigned to the new wing.

At Lawson, the 157th and 160th squadrons converted to Lockheed RF-80 Shooting Star daylight photo-reconnaissance jet aircraft, while the 112th, which had been a light bomber unit, retained its Douglas RB-26C Invaders, becoming a night reconnaissance unit.  The original plan was to deploy the 117th to France and reinforce the United States Air Forces in Europe at a new base, Toul-Rosières Air Base.  However Toul Air Base was still under construction, and delays forced the 117th to temporarily move to Neubiberg Air Base, Germany, along with its 160th Squadron, while the 112th was transferred to Wiesbaden Air Base and the 157th was located at Fürstenfeldbruck Air Base.  Headquarters and support organizations were located at Toul. The group and 112th Squadron finally moved to Toul, but the two F-80 squadrons remained in Germany while federalized.

On 10 July 1952 the 117th was released from active duty and inactivated. The 10th Tactical Reconnaissance Group was activated in its place and the mission, personnel and equipment of the 117th were transferred to the 10th.

Return to Alabama Air National Guard and inactivation

The group was again activated at Birmingham Airport, remaining the 117th Tactical Reconnaissance Group in state service.  Two of its squadrons, the 106th Tactical Reconnaissance Squadron, located with the group at Birmingham and the 160th at Dannelly Field, were Alabama Air National Guard units, while the 183d Tactical Reconnaissance Squadron was located at Hawkins Field, Mississippi. The group continued to fly the RB-26C until May 1957 when new Republic RF-84F Thunderflash jet reconnaissance aircraft replaced them. The group continued to train in tactical reconnaissance missions throughout the 1950s with the Thunderflashes until inactivated in 1959.

The 117th Wing had been mobilized during the during the Berlin Crisis of 1961.  This mobilization demonstrated that although mobilizing a wing with dispersed flying units was not a problem when the entire wing was called to active service, mobilizing individual flying squadron and elements to support it proved difficult. To resolve this, the Air Force determined to reorganize its National Guard wings by establishing groups with support elements for each of its squadrons to facilitate mobilization of elements of wings in various combinations when needed. Shortly after the 117th Wing returned to Alabama in July, the group was again activated as this plan was implemented.  The 184th Tactical Reconnaissance Squadron, of the Arkansas Air National Guard was briefly assigned to the group while this reorganization was being implemented.  The group remained active until December 1974, when the Air Force inactivated groups located on the same station as the wing to which they were assigned.

Reactivation

In 1993, the Air National Guard reorganized under the Air Force's Objective wing concept, which reintroduced groups under operational wings.  The group, redesignated the 117th Operations Group, was again activated as an element of the 117th Reconnaissance Wing.  After the end of Desert Storm, the phaseout of the McDonnell RF-4C Phantom II, flown by the 117th was accelerated.  During 1994, the group's RF-4Cs were sent to Davis-Monthan Air Force Base, Arizona for retirement.  On 1 October, the wing was redesignated the 117th Air Refueling Wing and began to fly Boeing KC-135 Stratotankers, the first tanker arriving later that month.

After the 9/11 attacks on the United States, the group deployed to MacDill Air Force Base, Florida and began refueling McDonnell Douglas F-15 Eagle and General Dynamics F-16 Fighting Falcon aircraft flying combat air patrol missions over major cities in the Southeastern United States as part of Operation Noble Eagle.  In 2009, the 99th Air Refueling Squadron, a regular unit assigned to the 6th Operations Group was activated.  Its members operate and maintain the group's aircraft alongside the Guardsmen assigned to the 106th Air Refueling Squadron.

Lineage
 Established as the 117th Fighter Group on 24 May 1946 and allotted to the National Guard
 Organized on 1 December 1946
 Extended federal recognition on 1 October 1947
 Federalized and ordered to active service on 22 October 1950
 Redesignated  117th Tactical Reconnaissance Group on 27 October 1950
 Inactivated and returned to Alabama State Control on 10 July 1952
 Activated on 10 July 1952
 Inactivated on 1 December 1959
 Activated on 22 August 1962
 Inactivated on 9 December 1974
 Redesignated 117th Operations Group
 Activated on 1 January 1993

Assignments
 54th Fighter Wing, 1 December 1946
 Tactical Air Command, 22 October 1950
 117th Tactical Reconnaissance Wing, 30 November 1950 – 10 July 1952
 117th Tactical Reconnaissance Wing, 10 July 1952 – 1 December 1959
 117th Tactical Reconnaissance Wing, 22 August 1962 – 9 December 1974
 117th Reconnaissance Wing (later 117th Air Refueling Wing), 1 January 1993 – present

Components
 99th Air Refueling Squadron: attached 1 October 2009 – present
 106th Tactical Reconnaissance Squadron (later 106th Reconnaissance Squadron, 106th Air Refueling Squadron): 1 January 1953 – 1 December 1959, 22 August 1962 – 9 December 1974, 1 January 1993 – present
 112th Tactical Reconnaissance Squadron, 27 October 1950 – 10 July 1952
 153d Fighter Squadron, 1 December 1946 – 27 October 1950, 1 December 1952 – 1 December 1959
 157th Fighter Squadron (later 157th Tactical Reconnaissance Squadron), 1948 – 10 July 1952
 160th Fighter Squadron (later 160th Tactical Reconnaissance Squadron), 1 September 1947 – 10 July 1952, 10 July 1952 – 1 December 1959, 22 August 1962 – 15 October 1962
 183d Tactical Reconnaissance Squadron, 1953 – c. 15 November 1957
 184th Tactical Reconnaissance Squadron, 22 August 1962 – 15 October 1962
 117th Operations Support Flight: 1 October 1993 – present

Stations
 Birmingham Municipal Airport, Alabama, 1 December 1957
 Lawson Air Force Base, Georgia, 22 October 1950 – February 1951
 Neubiberg Air Base, Germany, February 1951
 Wiesbaden Air Base, Germany, 2 June 1951
 Toul-Rosières Air Base, France, 27 January – 10 July 1952
 Birmingham Municipal Airport, Alabama, 10 July 1952 – 1 December 1959
 Birmingham Municipal Airport (later Sumpter Smith Air National Guard Base), Alabama, 22 August 1962 – 9 December 1974
 Sumpter Smith Air National Guard Base, Alabama, 1 January 1993 – present

Aircraft
 North American P-51 Mustang, 1947-1951
 Douglas RB-26C Invader, 1951-1957
 Lockheed RF-80 Shooting Star, 1951-1952
 Republic RF-84F Thunderflash, 1957-1959, 1962–1971
 McDonnell RF-4C Phantom II, 1971-1974, 1993-1994
 Boeing KC-135R Stratotanker, 1994–present

See also

 List of United States Air National Guard Groups & Wings
 List of A-26 Invader operators
 List of F-4 Phantom II operators

References
 Notes

 Citations

Bibliography

 
 
 
 
 
 

 Further reading

External links
 
 

Groups of the United States Air National Guard
Operations groups of the United States Air Force
Military units and formations of the United States in the Cold War
Military units and formations in Alabama
1946 establishments in Alabama